Headtrip to Nowhere is the major label debut album by the Canadian heavy metal band Flybanger. It was released on February 20, 2001, through Columbia Records. The CD is enhanced to include a video of the song "Outlived", not otherwise heard on the disc. The album included two tracks which had been released with the band's Outlived EP.  This album was Flybanger's only major release before disbanding.

Overview
The album was produced by Matt Wallace, known for his work with Faith No More and Deftones. Two songs feature a guest appearance by the former Faith No More guitarist Jim Martin. The third and final single to be released from the album, "Blind World", was used on the Dracula 2000 film soundtrack.

Various subject matters are examined in Headtrip to Nowhere. "Cavalry" tells a futuristic story;  "Evelyn" depicts sadness, "Blind World" is a commentary on people's response to Y2K Explicit references to drug use are made in "Crackballs".

The album cover photo shows Sean Evans, the art director. The album's title comes from the lyrics to "Evelyn".

Touring
In promotion of Headtrip to Nowhere, Flybanger toured with Clutch and Corrosion of Conformity before performing shows with extreme metal bands like Sepultura, Soulfly, Hatebreed and Chimaira in early 2001. That summer, they joined nu metal bands like Stereomud, Endo and The Union Underground for the Pain & Suffering tour. A DVD was released of the tour which included a live performance of "Cavalry".

Reception 

While not a significant commercial success, Headtrip to Nowhere was critically praised for its allegiance to traditional heavy metal and neglect for popular styles of the time such as nu metal. William Ruhlmann of AllMusic commended drummer Rob Wade for his engaging rhythms, noting "His work makes the band's music far more impressive than it would be otherwise." Natalie Hawk of Fast Forward magazine cited bass guitarist Tom MacDonald's work among the most outstanding and compared the overall style to that of Pantera. However, the large number of expletives used throughout the album, as well as its lack of musical originality, drew criticism, particularly from Jason Thompson of PopMatters. Many album reviews also panned the song "Crackballs" particularly.

CANOE's Mike Ross expressed overwhelming disappointment in the album's overly produced sound: "Every power chord, scream, atonal riff, gritty lyric and thundering groove – there's way too much going on, that's another thing [wrong with the album] – has been polished to perfection, sucking the life out of what could've been a worthy new hard-rock record." Contrary to other reviewers, however, Ross showed favor toward "Crack Balls". He also foresaw Flybanger as an exceptional live act but summed up the review by calling Headtrip to Nowhere "middle of the road metal".

Track listing

Personnel 
 Garth – lead vocals
 Bryan Fratesi – guitar
 Tom MacDonald – bass guitar, vocals
 Rob Wade – drums, percussion
 Jim Martin – guitar on tracks "Cavalry" and "When Are You (Gonna Die)?"
 Matt Wallace – production
 Dave Jerden – production, mixing
 Sean Evans – art direction

References

External links
 Full album stream of Headtrip to Nowhere

2001 debut albums
Flybanger albums
Columbia Records albums
Albums produced by Matt Wallace